Alfred Gerdes (24 October 1916 – 10 December 1962) was a German field hockey player who competed in the 1936 Summer Olympics.

He was a member of the German field hockey team, which won the silver medal. He played three matches as halfback.

External links
 
Alfred Gerdes' profile at databaseOlympics.com

1916 births
1962 deaths
Field hockey players at the 1936 Summer Olympics
German male field hockey players
Olympic field hockey players of Germany
Olympic silver medalists for Germany
Olympic medalists in field hockey
Medalists at the 1936 Summer Olympics